Ramón Delgado (born 14 November 1976) is a Paraguayan retired tennis player and current tennis coach. He turned professional in 1995 and achieved a career-high singles ranking of world No. 52 in April 1999. He reached the final at Bogotá in 1998 and the fourth round of the 1998 French Open, defeating Pete Sampras in the second round.

Tennis career

2002
In April 2002, Delgado lost in the first round of the Mallorca Open to a 15-year-old Rafael Nadal in Nadal's first ever ATP match. Nadal would go on to win 22 major titles as of the 2022 French Open.

2006
Delgado also nearly qualified for the 2006 Wimbledon Championships, but was defeated in the third and final qualifying round by Roko Karanušić.

2010
In October 2010, Delgado defeated Chilean Nicolás Massú in three sets (7-5, 2-6 y 6-3) to advance and face Spanish player Peré Riba at the last 16 stage of the Copa Petrobras.

2011
He announced his retirement from tennis in May 2011.

Coaching career
In 2011, Delgado began coaching tennis.

Delgado was captain of Paraguay's 2015 Fed Cup team, which was made up of Verónica Cepede Royg, Sarita Giménez, Camila Giangreco y Montserrat González.

ATP Tour career finals

Singles: 1 (1 runner-up)

ATP Challenger and ITF Futures finals

Singles: 15 (9–6)

Doubles: 17 (6–11)

Performance timeline

Singles

References

External links
 
 
 

1976 births
Hopman Cup competitors
Living people
Paraguayan male tennis players
Sportspeople from Asunción